The Advanced Mobile Telephone System (not to be confused with Advanced Mobile Phone System) was a Zero Generation (0G) method of radio communication, launched in 1965 in Japan and mainly was used in Japanese portable radio systems in the 1960s and '70s. Like its successor, HCMTS, it operated on the 900 MHz band.

References

Mobile radio telephone systems